The Victorian Railways V class was a single locomotive class that consisted of only V56. It was built as the shunter for the Jolimont Workshops to move the suburban sets through the washdocks. It had a top speed of 16 km/h although it was limited to 1 km/h when shunting through the washdock. This speed limit does not pose a problem in operation because heavy weight of rolling stock and weak engine prevents going much faster anyway. It had a tractor engine of 40 hp driving four hydraulic motors. It was the smallest locomotive owned by the VR.

Locomotives

Preservation
V56 is on static display at Newport Railway Museum.

References

V class
 
Broad gauge locomotives in Australia
Railway locomotives introduced in 1959
Shunting locomotives